The GAC GROUP 2011 World Table Tennis Championships was held at the Ahoy indoor sporting arena in Rotterdam, Netherlands from May 8 to May 15, 2011. This decision was announced in February 2008. It was the 51st edition contested. The tournament was organised by the ITTF and The Netherlands Table Tennis Association (NTTB). GAC GROUP was the title sponsor of the Championships.

Events and schedule
Five individual events were contested at the Championships. Qualification rounds were held from May 8 to 9.

Medal summary

Medal table

Events

Champions

Men's singles 

 Zhang Jike def.  Wang Hao, 12–10, 11–7, 6–11, 9–11, 11–5, 14–12.

Women's singles 

 Ding Ning def.  Li Xiaoxia, 12–10, 13–11, 11–9, 8–11, 8–11, 11–7.

Men's doubles 

 Ma Long /  Xu Xin def.  Chen Qi /  Ma Lin, 11–3, 11–8, 4–11, 11–4, 11–7.

Women's doubles 

 Guo Yue /  Li Xiaoxia def.  Ding Ning /  Guo Yan, 11–8, 11–5, 13–11, 11–8.

Mixed doubles 

 Zhang Chao /  Cao Zhen def.  Hao Shuai /  Mu Zi, 11–7, 11–7, 11–9, 9–11, 11–8.

References

External links 
 
 ITTF Site

 
World Table Tennis Championships
2011 World Table Tennis Championships
World Table Tennis Championships
2011 World Table Tennis Championships
World Table Tennis Championships
Table tennis competitions in the Netherlands
21st century in Rotterdam
May 2011 sports events in Europe